Émile Courtois (4 July 1918–25 June 2005) was a Belgian wrestler. He competed in the men's Greco-Roman middleweight at the 1952 Summer Olympics.

References

External links
 

1918 births
2005 deaths
Belgian male sport wrestlers
Olympic wrestlers of Belgium
Wrestlers at the 1952 Summer Olympics